Rufus Amis House and Mill is a historic home and grist mill and national historic district located near Virgilina, Granville County, North Carolina.  The house was built about 1855, and is a 1 1/2-story, "L"-shaped Gothic Revival / Greek Revival style frame dwelling.  It has a roof with six gables and delicately sawn bargeboards.  Also on the property are the contributing smokehouse, icehouse (later a striphouse), privy, barn, chicken house, corn crib, mill race, former dwelling, and 3 1/2-story grist mill.

It was listed on the National Register of Historic Places in 1988.

References

Tobacco buildings in the United States
Farms on the National Register of Historic Places in North Carolina
Historic districts on the National Register of Historic Places in North Carolina
Gothic Revival architecture in North Carolina
Greek Revival houses in North Carolina
Houses completed in 1855
Houses in Granville County, North Carolina
National Register of Historic Places in Granville County, North Carolina